Dicaesium silver hexabromobismuthate is an inorganic compound with the formula Cs2AgBiBr6. Being a stable double perovskite material, it is applied to photocatalytic reduction of carbon dioxide.

Synthesis 
Dicaesium silver hexabromobismuthate can be synthesized by mixing stoichiometrical caesium bromide, silver bromide and bismuth(III) bromide in 48% hydrobromic acid. Its nanocrystals can be prepared using the hot-injection method in organic solvent at higher temperature.

References

Caesium compounds
Silver compounds
Bismuth compounds
Bromo complexes